Alone at the Microphone is Royal City's second album.

Track listing
 "Bad Luck" – 3:27
 "Under a Hallow Tree" – 1:49
 "My Brother is the Meatman" – 3:08
 "Spacy Basement" - 4:35
 "Dank Is the Air of Death and Loathing" – 3:28
 "Don't You" – 3:33
 "You Are the Vine" – 4:00
 "Daisies" – 2:56
 "Blood and Faeces" – 2:34
 "Rum Tobacco" – 5:59
 "And Miriam Took a Timbrel in Her Hand" – 3:37

References

2001 albums
Royal City (band) albums
Rough Trade Records albums
Three Gut Records albums